The  is the third season of the Bleach anime series. In the English adaptation of the anime released by Viz Media, the title of the season is translated as The Rescue. The episodes are directed by Noriyuki Abe, and produced by TV Tokyo, Dentsu and Studio Pierrot. The season adapts Tite Kubo's Bleach manga series from the rest of the 14th volume to the 21st volume (chapters 118–182), with the exception of episode 50 (filler). The episodes' plot centers on Ichigo Kurosaki's and his friends' efforts to save Soul Reaper Rukia Kuchiki from execution by her superiors in the Soul Society.

The season initially ran from July 26, 2005, to January 10, 2006, in Japan on TV Tokyo. The English adaptation of the season began airing on July 21, 2007 on Cartoon Network's Adult Swim in the United States. On October 14, 2007, the series went on a hiatus; episodes resumed airing on March 2, 2008, and finished on May 11 of the same year.

The episodes use four pieces of theme music: two opening themes and two ending themes. The opening theme for the first ten episodes is "D-TecnoLife" by Uverworld; the other episodes of the season use  by High and Mighty Color. The two ending themes are "HappyPeople" by Skoop on Somebody, used from episode 42 to 52, and Yui's "Life", which was used for the remainder of the episodes.

Five DVD compilations, each containing four episodes of the season, with the exception of the last two discs with contain five episodes, were released by Aniplex between December 21, 2005 to April 26, 2006. The English adaptation of the anime is distributed by Viz Media; three DVD compilations have been released on July 22, September 23, and November 18, 2008 respectively. Another DVD compilation was set for release on January 20, 2009.



Episode list

Notes

References

General

Specific

2005 Japanese television seasons
2006 Japanese television seasons
Season 03